
Geer is a municipality in Belgium.

Geer may also refer to:

People

Given name
 Geer van Velde (1898–1977), a Dutch painter

Surname
 Billy Geer (1859–1885), an American baseball player
 Charles Geer (1922–2008), an American illustrator and author
 Charlotte Geer (born 1957), an American Olympic rower
 Dan Geer, an American computer security analyst
 Ellen Geer (born 1941), an American actress
 Helen Thornton Geer (1903–1983), an American author, professor, and librarian
 Isaac Wheeler Geer (1873–1953), an American railroad executive
 John van de Geer (1926–2008), Dutch psychologist
 Josh Geer (born 1983), an American baseball player
 Kevin Geer (1954–2017), an American actor
 Martha A. Geer, an American judge
 Peter Zack Geer (1928–1977), an American politician
 Ralph Carey Geer (1816–1895), an American farmer and politician
 Sara van de Geer (born 1958), Dutch statistician
 Theodore Thurston Geer (1851–1924), an American politician
 Trevor Geer (born 1953), a British speedway racer
 Will Geer (1902–1978), an American actor
 William Dudley Geer (1922–2003), an American educator

Places
 Geer, Vijfheerenlanden, Netherlands
 Geer, Virginia, United States
 Geer, Michigan, United States
 Geer River, or Jeker, in Belgium and the Netherlands

See also
 De Geer, a family of Walloon origin
 Geers, a surname
 Gear (disambiguation)
 Geare, a surname
 Gere (disambiguation)